Run into the Light is the second extended play (EP) by English singer and songwriter Ellie Goulding, released exclusively on the iTunes Store on 30 August 2010 by Polydor Records. The EP consists of six remixes of tracks from Goulding's debut album, Lights, four of them being previously unreleased.

To mark her partnership with Nike, Goulding released a 30-minute-long mix titled Run into the Light through iTunes in September 2011. Mixed by Alex Metric, it is intended to be a soundtrack for running.

Track listing

Notes
  signifies a remixer

Charts

References

2010 EPs
Albums produced by Fraser T. Smith
Ellie Goulding albums
ITunes-exclusive releases
Polydor Records EPs
Remix EPs
Albums produced by Richard Stannard (songwriter)